The Science Fiction Source Book is a book by David Wingrove published in 1984.

Plot summary
The Science Fiction Source Book is a book which grades over 2500 books by 880 authors by awarding them up to 5 stars in the categories of Readability, Characterization, Idea Content and Literary Merit.

Reception
Dave Langford reviewed The Science Fiction Source Book for White Dwarf #59, and stated that "This is a game with no ending. The Sourcebook is enormous fun for browsing in, raising your eyebrows at, and violently disagreeing with. Just don't trust those stars!"

Reviews
Review by Neil Barron (1984) in Fantasy Review, August 1984
Review by Don D'Ammassa (1984) in Science Fiction Chronicle, #60 September 1984

References

Science fiction books